Foi, also known as Foe or Mubi River, is one of the two East Kutubuan languages of the Trans-New Guinea family spoken along Lake Kutubu and Mubi River, located in the Southern Highlands Province of Papua New Guinea. Dialects of Foi are Ifigi, Kafa, Kutubu, Mubi. A Swadesh list for the Foi language was documented by The Rosetta Project in 2010. The estimated number of Foi speakers as of 2015 is between 6,000 and 8,000.

Grammar

Syntax 
Foi is a subject–object–verb language, similar to most languages in Papua New Guinea. 

Foe adopts the usage of focused objects as sentence-initial. In noun phrases, Foi follows the pattern of Noun + Quantifier and Adjective + Noun.   

Adverbial phrases are marked postpositionally by clitics in Foi.  

Foi also has a series of evidentials to mark the verbal aspect of seen, unseen, deduced, possibility, and mental deduction.

Morphology  

The subject or focus transitive in a sentence is marked with -mo as shown in example (1) below.Where the focus is on the person who is eating the sweet potato.

Lexical  
Foi has separate words for today and yesterday, as well as two, three, four and five days prior and hence.

Pronouns 
Singular, dual, and plural are distinguished in personal pronouns. In addition, Foe also marks clusivity for first-person pronouns.

It was not made clear if a reported minimal distinction in the first-person plural form between the inclusive jia and exclusive jija is real.

Phonology

Vowels 
Foi features 5 vowels.

Consonants 
The 16 consonants including the glottal stop used in Foi  are:

Allophonic variation of [t], [d] and [r] is common.

The vowel /y/ was mentioned as a consonant by Franklin, suggesting that the research was phonetically noted in Americanist phonetic notation.  The table above has been amended according to the standards of International Phonetic Alphabet.

Body-part counting system 
Foi adopts the body-part counting system. This feature can also be found in approximately 60 Trans-New Guinea Languages such as Fasu and Oksapmin. 

Counting typically begins by touching (and usually bending) the fingers of one hand, moves up the arm to the shoulders and neck, and in some systems, to other parts of the upper body or the head. A central point serves as the half-way point. Once this is reached, the counter continues, touching and bending the corresponding points on the other side until the fingers are reached.

Language status 
According to Ethnologue, the language status of is '5*', referring to the situation whereby the language is anticipated to be in vigorous use by all, based on the informed guess made by editorial team due to the lack of information. This status is based on Lewis and Smino's (2010) Expanded Graded Intergenerational Disruption Scale (EGIDS).

Further reading
Rule, Murray. 1993. The Culture and Language of the Foe: The People of Lake Kutubu, Southern Highlands Province, Papua New Guinea. Merewether, New South Wales: Chevron Niugini.

References

External links 
 Timothy Usher, New Guinea World, Foe

Languages of Southern Highlands Province
East Kutubuan languages